Brad Anae (born October 3, 1957) is a former American football defensive end who played three seasons in the United States Football League (USFL) with the Philadelphia Stars, Houston Gamblers and San Antonio Gunslingers. He first enrolled at the University of Hawaii before transferring to the Brigham Young University. He attended Kahuku High & Intermediate School in Kahuku, Hawaii.

Early years
Anae played high school football for the Kahuku High School Red Raiders. He was named to state all-star teams and was team captain while the Red Raiders' record during his three varsity years was 21-10.

College career
Anae first played college football in 1976 for the Hawaii Rainbow Warriors of the University of Hawaii. He transferred to play for the BYU Cougars, He was a two-year starter for the Cougars, earning All-WAC honors in 1980 and 1981. Anae also earned third team All-American honors in 1981, starting in the Holiday Bowl, and honorable mention All-American honors in 1980.

Professional career
Anae signed with the Philadelphia Eagles of the National Football League in 1982. He joined the Philadelphia Stars of the USFL late in 1982 and played in three games for the team in 1983. He played for the USFL's Houston Gamblers in 1984. Anae was signed by the San Antonio Gunslingers of the USFL on November 23, 1984. He played in eight games for the Gunslingers, starting five.

Personal life
Anae's father, Famika, and brothers Robert and Matt also played for the BYU Cougars. Robert's son, Famika, was an offensive lineman for the Cougars before ending his career due to injures in 2012. Anae's son, Bradlee, is a defensive end for the Dallas Cowboys.

References

External links
Just Sports Stats

Living people
1957 births
Players of American football from Compton, California
Players of American football from Hawaii
American sportspeople of Samoan descent
American football defensive ends
Hawaii Rainbow Warriors football players
BYU Cougars football players
Philadelphia/Baltimore Stars players
Houston Gamblers players
San Antonio Gunslingers players
People from Laie